Castleford Central and Glasshoughton is an electoral ward of the City of Wakefield district used for elections to Wakefield Metropolitan District Council.

Overview 
The ward is one of 21 in the Wakefield district, and has been held by Labour since the current boundaries were formed for the 2004 Council election. As of 2019, the electorate stands at 12,093 of which, according to the 2011 Census, 95.7% identify as "White British" and 66.5% of who identify as Christian.

The ward is situated in the north of the District and incorporates central Castleford, Wheldon Road and Lock Lane, Glasshoughton, Redhill (part), Smawthorne Estate, The Maltkilns, the Potteries and the Healdfield area. The south of the ward is bounded by the M62 motorway, and the boundary to the north of the ward is defined by the River Aire and River Calder.

Representation 
Like all wards in the Wakefield district, Castleford Central and Glashoughton has 3 councillors, whom are elected on a 4-year-rota. This means elections for new councillors are held for three years running, with one year every four years having no elections.

The current councillors are Richard Forster, Tony Wallis and Denise Jeffery, all of whom are Labour.

Jeffery is currently the Leader of Wakefield Council, after her predecessor Peter Box  stood down after 21 years in the position.

Notable former councillors for this ward include former West Yorkshire Police and Crime Commissioner Mark Burns-Williamson.

Councillors

Ward results 

This by-election was caused by the resignation of Mark Burns-Williamson as he successfully ran to be West Yorkshire Police and Crime Commissioner.

References 

City of Wakefield
Politics of Wakefield
Wards of Wakefield